This is a list of banks in Timor-Leste.

Central bank 
 Banco Central de Timor-Leste

Commercial banks

References

East Timor
Banks
East Timor